Caucagua River is a river of Venezuela, a tributary of the Tuy River. It is part of the Orinoco River basin.

Tributaries include the Pacairigua River, Guarenas River, Araira River.

See also
List of rivers of Venezuela

References
Rand McNally, The New International Atlas, 1993.

Rivers of Venezuela
Rivers of Miranda (state)